Karma & Desire is the seventh solo studio album by British electronic music producer Actress, released on Ninja Tune on 23 October 2020. Its announcement was preceded by the surprise release of a single-file album by Actress named 88, which included a PDF hinting towards Karma & Desires track listing. Originally teased via a Twitter post in May 2020, the album was officially announced on 1 September 2020 and described by Actress as being "a romantic tragedy set between the heavens and the underworld". The announcement of the album was accompanied by the release of the lead single from the album, "Walking Flames", featuring British singer and producer Sampha. The album was included in Pitchfork’s 41 Most Anticipated Albums of Fall 2020.

On 23 October 2020, Karma & Desire was released with Ninja Tune. Accompanying its release, Actress released a short film entitled after the album. The film was directed by Lee Bootee and includes appearances from Sampha, Zsela and Aura T-09 who all feature on the album. The album reached number 4 on the UK electronic album charts and was well received by critics, with Actress being acclaimed for further developing his sound. Bandcamp described it as "warmer and more generous than anything he’s released to date", and in a 10/10 review, Future Music added it is “a masterpiece of ethereal, smudged contemporary electronic music" and "perhaps Actress’ most accomplished work to date". Karma & Desire was regarded as one of the best albums of 2020, being featured in The Guardian's 50 best albums of 2020 and reaching number 31 in Clash's Albums of the Year 2020 list. Karma & Desire has been nominated for A2IM's 2021 Libera Award for Best Dance/Electronic Album.

Track listing

References 

2020 albums
Actress (musician) albums
Ninja Tune albums